Kelly Lake is a neighborhood of the city of Hibbing in St. Louis County, Minnesota, United States. County Road 60 / Rainey Road / 1st Avenue serves as a main arterial route in the community. Previously, Kelly Lake was its own unincorporated community before it was annexed by the city of Hibbing. U.S. Route 169 is nearby.

References

Neighborhoods in Minnesota
Geography of St. Louis County, Minnesota
Hibbing, Minnesota